David Van Vactor (May 8, 1906 – March 24, 1994) was an American composer of contemporary classical music.

He was born in Plymouth, Indiana, and received Bachelor of Music (1928) and Master of Music (1935) degrees from Northwestern University. He studied with Arne Oldberg, Mark Wessel, Ernst Nolte (composer), Leo Sowerby, Paul Dukas, Franz Schmidt, and Arnold Schoenberg.

He was the assistant conductor of the Chicago Civic Orchestra (1933–34) and was both the flute section leader and assistant conductor of the Kansas City Philharmonic Orchestra from 1943 to 1947. He served as the conductor of the Knoxville Symphony Orchestra from 1947 until 1972. He also appeared as guest conductor with the New York Philharmonic-Symphony Orchestra, the Cleveland Orchestra, the Chicago Symphony Orchestra, the London Philharmonic Orchestra, the Frankfurt Radio Symphony Orchestra, and the orchestras of Rio de Janeiro and Santiago, Chile.

He composed well over one hundred major works, including seven symphonies, nine concertos, five large pieces for chorus and orchestra, many orchestral, chamber and vocal works, and four pieces for symphonic band. In 1938 his Symphony in D won the Second Annual Competition of the New York Philharmonic-Symphony Society for a major symphonic work by a U. S. composer (his former teacher Mark Wessel received the sole Honorable Mention in the same competition). The Symphony was premiered on January 19, 1939 by the Philharmonic-Symphony, conducted by the composer. His music was recorded by the conductor William Strickland.

He was Professor of Composition and Flute at the University of Tennessee, Knoxville.  His notable students include the "Van Vactor Five": Gilbert Trythall, Richard Trythall, David P. Sartor, Jesse Ayers,  and Doug Davis. He was named Composer Laureate of the State of Tennessee by the  Tennessee State Legislature and was succeeded in that position by another of his composition students, Michael Kurek in 2022.  He died in Los Angeles, California, in 1994.

The David Van Vactor Collection is held by the University of Tennessee Special Collections Library in Knoxville, Tennessee.

Discography
1958 – Fantasia, Chaconne, and Allegro. (With N. V. Bentzon, Pezzi sinfonici, op.109, and Walter Piston, Serenata). Louisville Orchestra, Robert Whitney, cond. Louisville LP, LOU-58-6.
1969 – The Music of David Van Vactor (Everest)
1970 – Concerto a quattro; Concerto for Viola and Orchestra. Willy Schmidt, Werner Peschke, Karl Hermann Seyfried, flutes; Charlotte Cassedanne-Haase, harp; Hans Eurich, viola; Hessischer Rundfunk Sinfonieorchester, David Van Vactor, cond. Orion LP ORS 7024
1976 – American Music for Flute and Piano (includes Van Vactor's Sonatina for Flute and Piano), Keith Bryan, flute; Karen Keys, piano. Orion LP, ORS 76242.
1995 – The Music of David Van Vactor. Symphony No. 1; Symphony No. 3; Recitativo and Saltarello, for orchestra; Sinfonia Breve. Frankfurt Radio Symphony Orchestra (Symphony No. 1); Hessischer Rundfunk Sinfonieorchester, David Van Vactor, cond. CRI CD 702. Material originally released on LPs, by CRI SD 169 (1963) and SD 225 (1968), and by Orion ORS 6910 (1969)
2006 – Episodes—Jesus Christ. The Knoxville Choral Society and Orchestra, J. B. Lyle, cond. CD Baby 103615.

References

Anon. (1938a). "Van Vactor Wins $1,000 Music Prize; American Composer Receives Philharmonic Society Award for His Symphony in D". New York Times (September 13): 27.
Anon. (1938b). "Evanstonians". Time (September 26).
Bayne, Pauline Shaw (ed.) (1993). The David Van Vactor Collection: A Catalog. Knoxville: The University of Tennessee Press, Knoxville Libraries.
Bayne, Pauline (2001). "Van Vactor, David". The New Grove Dictionary of Music and Musicians, edited by Stanley Sadie and John Tyrrell. New York: Grove's Dictionaries.
Downes, Olin (1939). "Van Vactor Work Has Its Premiere: Prize-Winning Symphony Is Played by Philharmonic at Carnegie Hall; Nathan Milstein Heard: The Violinist's Performance of Mendelssohn Concerto Wins Approval of Audience". New York Times (January 20).
Ramsey, Russell Giffin (1971). "David Van Vactor: Composer, Musician and Educator." M.S. thesis. Knoxville, Tennessee: University of Tennessee.
Van Vactor, David, and Katherine D. Moore (1960). Every Child May Hear. Knoxville, Tennessee: The University of Tennessee Press.

External links
David Van Vactor page
 
David Van Vactor biography at Knoxville Symphony Orchestra site
David Van Vactor Collection in University of Tennessee Digital Collections
Interview with David Van Vactor, March 15, 1986

1906 births
1994 deaths
American male classical composers
American classical composers
20th-century classical composers
People from Plymouth, Indiana
Northwestern University alumni
Musicians from Indiana
University of Tennessee faculty
20th-century American composers
20th-century American male musicians